Mummering is a  Christmas-time house-visiting tradition practised in Newfoundland and Labrador, Ireland, City of Philadelphia, and parts of the United Kingdom.

Also known as mumming or janneying, it typically involves a group of friends or family who dress in disguise and visit homes within their community or neighbouring communities during the twelve days of Christmas. If the mummers are welcomed into a house, they often do a variety of informal performances that may include dance, music, jokes, or recitations. The hosts must guess the mummers' identities before offering them food or drink. They may poke and prod the mummers or ask them questions. To make this a challenge for the hosts, the mummers may stuff their costumes, cross-dress, or speak while inhaling (ingressive speech). Once the mummers have been identified, they remove their disguises, spend some social time with the hosts, and then travel as a group to the next home.

History
An old Christmas custom from England and Ireland, mummering in a version of its modern form can be traced back in Newfoundland into the 19th century. Although it is unclear precisely when this tradition was brought to Newfoundland by the English and Irish, the earliest record dates back to 1819. Some state that the tradition was brought to Newfoundland by Irish immigrants from County Wexford. The tradition varied, and continues to vary, from community to community. Some formal aspects of the tradition, such as the mummers play, have largely died out, with the informal house-visiting remaining the predominant form.

On June 25, 1861, an "Act to make further provisions for the prevention of Nuisances" was introduced in response to the death of Isaac Mercer in Bay Roberts. Mercer had been murdered by a group of masked mummers on December 28, 1860. The Bill made it illegal to wear a disguise in public without permission of the local magistrate.  Mummering in rural communities continued despite the passage of the Bill, although the practice did die out in larger towns and cities.

In the 1980s, mummering experienced a revival, thanks to the locally popular musical duo Simani, who wrote and recorded "Any Mummers Allowed In?" (commonly referred to as "The Mummer's Song") in 1982. Folklorist Dr. Joy Fraser has noted that, "in common with many other folk revivals, the resurgence of Christmas mummering in Newfoundland is largely based on a selective and idealised conceptualisation of the custom. As part of this revival, one particular form of mummering - the informal house-visit described above - has come to represent the custom in Newfoundland as a whole, while other forms that were equally prominent in the island’s cultural history have received comparatively little attention."

In 2009, the Heritage Foundation of Newfoundland and Labrador's Intangible Cultural Heritage office established what would become an annual Mummers Festival, culminating in a Mummers Parade in St. John's. The success of the festival has influenced, in part, another revitalization and increase of interest in the tradition in the province.

See also
 Ugly stick

References

External links 

Annual Mummers Festival, St. John's, Newfoundland
Christmas Traditions on the Memorial University Intangible Cultural Heritage website

Culture of Newfoundland and Labrador
Winter traditions
Christmas in Canada
Christmas in Ireland
Christmas in the United Kingdom
Ritual masks